The Switch is the second studio album by American singer-songwriter Emily King. It was released by Making Music Records on June 26, 2015 in the United States. Featuring main production from Jeremy Most, it reached number 41 on the US Billboard Top R&B/Hip-Hop Albums chart.

Track listing

Charts

References

Emily King albums
2015 albums